The Democratic Party of Labour (PDM) was a political party in Romania.

History
The PDM contested the 1990 general elections, receiving around 0.4% of the vote in the Chamber elections and 0.3% of the vote in the Senate elections. Although it failed to win a seat in the Senate, the party won a single seat in the Chamber. The 1992 elections saw the party's vote share in the Chamber elections fall to 0.03%, resulting in it losing its seat.

Electoral history

Legislative elections

References

Defunct socialist parties in Romania
Political parties with year of establishment missing
Political parties with year of disestablishment missing